Peter Abraham Guinari (born 2 June 2001) is a Central African professional footballer who plays as a centre-back for the Central African Republic national team.

Club career
Guinari was born in Bangui, Central African Republic and moved to Germany at the age of 10. He began playing football at FC Phoenix Munich before he was accepted at the youth academy of 1860 Munich. As next step he moved to fifth-tier club Pipinsried in 2020.

International career
Guinari made his debut with the Central African Republic national team in a 1–1 2022 FIFA World Cup qualification tie with Cape Verde on 1 September 2021.

References

External links
 
 

2001 births
Living people
People from Bangui
Central African Republic footballers
Central African Republic international footballers
Association football defenders
FC Pipinsried players
Regionalliga players
Central African Republic expatriate footballers
Central African Republic expatriate sportspeople in Germany
Expatriate footballers in Germany